Bobby's Ghoul was a comic strip originally appearing in the British comic Whizzer and Chips, and later Buster after the two comics merged.

The story revolved around a boy, Bobby, and his girlfriend, who happened to be a ghost. As such, she was able to fly, pass through walls, and do all sorts of ghostly things, causing great hilarity and hi-jinks.

The title of the comic is probably a pun on Bobby's Girl, which was a hit in the 1960s for the singer Susan Maughan.

Artist Jack Edward Oliver included the characters on the last page of Buster's final issue, revealing how all the characters in the comic came to an end. Bobby's girlfriend breaks up with him because while she has remained young (due to being a ghost), he has aged and become a bald, wrinkled, toothless old man.

Comic strips missing date information
Fleetway and IPC Comics